Jack Kirby (1923-2007) was a player in the National Football League.

Biography
Kirby was born Jack Evans Kirby on September 21, 1923, in Los Angeles, California. He died on March 9, 2007, in Santa Barbara, California.

Career
Kirby played with the Green Bay Packers during the 1949 NFL season. He played at the collegiate level at the University of Southern California. Jack was also All City in Los Angeles  in 1942 when he played for the Dorsey High School Dons.

See also
List of Green Bay Packers players

References

1923 births
2007 deaths
Players of American football from Los Angeles
Green Bay Packers players
USC Trojans football players